Sarpsborg Station is located at the city of Sarpsborg in Norway on the Østfold Line. The station is served by regional trains between Oslo and Halden with hourly headway by Vy.

History

The station was opened in 1879 as part of the Østfold line. In 1882 the Eastern Østfold Line was built with terminus at Sarpsborg Station.

References

External links

Railway stations in Østfold
Railway stations on the Østfold Line
Railway stations opened in 1879
1879 establishments in Norway
Sarpsborg